Galley Down Wood is a  biological Site of Special Scientific Interest north-east of Bishop's Waltham in Hampshire.

This wood, which was planted with beech trees in around 1930, has a well developed beech flora. Flowering plants include bird's-nest orchid, white helleborine, greater butterfly-orchid, common spotted orchid and the nationally rare long-leaved helleborine.

References

Sites of Special Scientific Interest in Hampshire
Bishop's Waltham